BayReham is a 2018 Pakistani soap drama serial directed by Abid Rahim, produced by Babar Javed and written by Samina Ejaz. The drama stars Omer Shahzad and Sumaiyya Bukhsh in lead roles,  and was first aired on 17 July 2018 on Geo Entertainment, where it aired  Monday to Friday followed by Umm-e-Haniya. The story is about the psycho husband who tortures his wife.

Cast
Sumaiyya Bukhsh as Ashi
Omer Shahzad as Rehan
Jahanara Hai as Ashi's grandmother	
Raja Feroz  as Faisal
Ikram Abbasi as Jamshed
Benita David as Faiza
Sami ur Rehman as Faraz
Farzana Thaeem as Safia
Waqas Khan as Farhan
Seema Khan as Atiya
Kiran Qureshi as Aaliya
Shazia Gohar as Durdana

References

Geo TV original programming
Pakistani television series
2018 Pakistani television series debuts